Senator Lopez or López may refer to:

Carlos Dávila López (fl. 1990s–2000s), Senate of Puerto Rico
Ernesto Lopez (fl. 2000s–2010s), Delaware State Senate
Fernando Lopez (1904–1993), Senate of the Philippines
Joe Eddie Lopez (born 1939), Arizona State Senate
Juan Hernández López (1859–1944), Senate of Puerto Rico
Linda J. Lopez (born 1948), Arizona State Senate
Linda M. Lopez (born 1964), New Mexico State Senate
Luis Negrón López (1909–1991), Senate of Puerto Rico